Norman H. Woods (1908–1987) was an important North American golf course architect who designed many courses in Canada and the United States.  He apprenticed under course designer Stanley Thompson and he was a member of the American Society of Golf Course Architects from 1954 until 1976.  He died in 1987.

Courses designed 
(Not an exhaustive list)

 Broadmoor Public Golf Course, Sherwood Park, Alberta, Canada
 Capitol City Golf Club, Lacey, Washington, US
 Glendale Golf and Country Club, Edmonton, Alberta, Canada
 Highlands Golf Club, Billings, Montana, US
 Kokanee Springs Resort, Crawford Bay, British Columbia, Canada
 Lords Valley Country Club, Hawley, Pennsylvania, US
 Marias Valley Golf Club, Shelby, Montana, US 
 Nile Shrine Golf Course, Mountlake Terrace, Washington, US
 Rossmere Country Club, Winnipeg, Manitoba, Canada
 Signal Point Golf Club, Fort Benton, Montana, Canada 
 Stony Plain Golf Course, Stony Plain, Alberta, Canada
 Falcon Lake Golf Course, Whiteshell Provincial Park, Manitoba, Canada
 Revelstoke Golf Club, Revelstoke, British Columbia, Canada
 Hirsch Creek Golf Course Front Nine (Kitimat, British Columbia)

References 

Golf course architects
1987 deaths
1908 births